Political ethics (also known as political morality or public ethics) is the practice of making moral judgments about political action and political agents. It covers two areas. The first is the ethics of process (or the ethics of office), which deals with public officials and their methods. The second area is the ethics of policy (or ethics and public policy), which concerns judgments surrounding policies and laws.

The concept of political morality can be easily understood when the roots of the term and its gradual development are assessed. The core values and expectations of political morality have historically derived from the principles of justice. However, John Rawls defends the theory that the political concept of justice is ultimately based on the common good of the individual rather than on the values one is expected to follow.

While trying to make moral judgments about political issues, people also leverage their own perceived definition of morality. The concept of morality itself derives from several moral foundations. Morality, seen through the lens of these foundations, shapes peoples' judgments about political actions and political agents.

Ethics of process
Niccolò Machiavelli is one of the most famous political theorists who spoke on, and later subverted, the matters of political ethics. Unlike Aristotle, he believed that a political leader may be required to behave in evil ways if necessary to maintain his authority.

In contemporary democracies, a variant of this idea has been reframed as the problem of dirty hands, described most influentially by Michael Walzer, who argues that the problem creates a paradox: the politician must sometimes "do wrong to do right". The politician uses violence to prevent greater violence, but his act is still wrong even if justified. Walzer's view has been criticized. Some critics object that either the politician is justified or not. If justified, there is nothing wrong, though he may feel guilty. Others say that some of the acts of violence that Walzer would allow are never justified, no matter what the ends. Dennis Thompson has argued that in a democracy citizens should hold the leader responsible, and therefore if the act is unjustified their hands are dirty too.

In large organizations it is often not possible to tell who is actually responsible for the outcomes—a problem known as the problem of many hands.

Political ethics not only permits leaders to do things that would be wrong in private life but requires them to meet higher standards than would be necessary for private life. For example, they may have less of a right to privacy than do ordinary citizens, and no right to use their office for personal profit. The major issues here ultimately concern the concept of conflict of interest.

As stated above, personal or private morality and political morality are often viewed as a conflict of interest. However, it is important to know that these two concepts of morality can also maintain a common positive relationship between the two. Whether an individual is involved in the political domain as an authority or as an active civic participant, these values bleed through to the personal sector of morality as well. An individual that learned the skills necessary in the political sector may apply these learned qualities in a setting outside of politics, often viewed as a private everyday setting. In contrast, one that is entering the political setting may have already held the qualities and virtues that are expected in the professional setting. Therefore the values  already held will then be applied to the new political setting, as anticipated. Reciprocity, as in the context of deriving those traits are commonly present when entering the field if the qualities were not already learned. Both concepts of morality include different expectations, but to say the least, there is a correlation present between the two. Whether the virtues and values were acquired or previously held, they simply factor in and apply to both settings. Those that have emerged into the intense political sphere, knowing that virtues and morals can certainly be an influence, but building one's character can be substantially beneficial prior to the entrance.

Ethics of policy
Personal morality is also factored into public morality as discussed in the previous section in another way, which is relevant to this area of political ethics. Given the democratic republic present in the United States, public morality is often referred to as 'formal'. Abiding by the order of law, in addition maintaining respect are simply two critical factors in order to achieve the concept of public morality. These elements are expected when an individual is actively participating in the political sphere and ultimately required for the behavior of political authorities. Each citizen has their own belief and morals toward a particularly controversial topic, nonetheless, it is the political authorities' duty to respect others' beliefs and advocate for the beliefs of their constituents while following the law and constitution.

In the other area of political ethics, the key issues are not the conflict between means and ends but the conflicts among the ends themselves. For example, in the question of global justice, the conflict is between the claims of the nation state and citizens on one side and the claims of all citizens of the world. Traditionally, priority has been given to the claims of nations, but in recent years thinkers  known as cosmopolitans have pressed the claims of all citizens of the world.

Political ethics deals not mainly with ideal justice, however, but with realizing moral values in democratic societies where citizens (and philosophers) disagree about what ideal justice is. In a pluralist society, how if at all can governments justify a policy of progressive taxation, affirmative action, the right to abortion, universal healthcare, and the like? Political ethics is also concerned with moral problems raised by the need for political compromise, whistleblowing, civil disobedience, and criminal punishment.

Foundations of (political) morality

According to Graham et al. (2009), there are two broad classes of moral foundations: individualizing foundations and binding foundations.

Individualizing foundations 
The two individualizing foundations to morality are the fairness/reciprocity foundation (ethic of justice), and the harm/care foundation (ethic of care). The former represents a person's desire for fairness and reciprocity. The latter concerns the caring attitude of a person towards another.

Binding foundations 
The three binding foundations are in-group/loyalty, authority/respect, and purity/sanctity. The first two correspond to ethic of community, and represent a person's belonging and attachment to a group dynamic and is concerned with feelings like patriotism, obedience, etc. The last foundation corresponds to the ethic of divinity and represents a person's desire to suppress/control humanity's nature of lust, selfishness, etc, usually via spirituality.

Moral foundations, political identity and moral political judgements
Graham et al. (2009) conducted a study to determine whether moral judgments about politics are affected a certain way by explicit or implicit political identities. Explicit political identity is the identity supplied by the study participant explicitly during the study. Implicit political identity is the participant's identity determined by the scientists based on an IAT test. 

For both, explicitly and implicitly supplied identities, they found that liberals gave more weightage to the individualizing foundations than the binding foundations, while making a moral judgment regarding political issues. On the other hand, the conservatives seemed to give an approximately equal weightage to both classes of foundations.  However, they note that this distinction is not necessarily true across time and space.

Criticisms
Some critics (so-called political realists) argue that ethics has no place in politics. If politicians are to be effective in the real world, they cannot be bound by moral rules. They have to pursue the national interest. However, Walzer points out that if the realists are asked to justify their claims, they will almost always appeal to moral principles of their own (for example, to show that ethics is harmful or counterproductive).

Another kind of criticism comes from those who argue that we should not pay so much attention to politicians and policies but should instead look more closely at the larger structures of society where the most serious ethical problems lie. Advocates of political ethics respond that while structural injustice should not be ignored, too much emphasis on structures neglects the human agents who are responsible for changing them.

See also
Legal ethics
Moral authority
Natural and legal rights
Political philosophy
Political theology
Statism
Moral foundations theory

References

Further reading
Applbaum, Arthur Isak. "Democratic Legitimacy and Official Discretion," Philosophy & Public Affairs 21 (1992), pp. 240–274.
Beerbohm, Eric. In Our Name: The Ethics of Democracy (Princeton University Press, 2012). 
Bok, Sissela. Lying: Moral Choice in Public and Private Life (Vintage, 1999). 
Dworkin, Ronald. Is Democracy Possible Here? Principles for a New Political Debate (Princeton University Press, 2008). 
Gutmann, Amy, and Dennis Thompson. The Spirit of Compromise (Princeton University Press, 2012). 
Fleishman, Joel, Lance Liebman, and Mark H. Moore, eds. Public Duties: The Moral Obligations of Government Officials (Harvard University Press, 1981). 
Margalit, Avishai. On Compromise and Rotten Compromises (Princeton University Press, 2009). 
Mendus, Susan. Politics and Morality (Polity Press, 2009). 
Parrish, John M. Paradoxes of Political Ethics: From Dirty Hands to the Invisible Hand (Cambridge University Press, 2007). 
Philip, Mark. Political Conduct (Harvard University Press, 2007). 
Sabl, Andrew. Ruling Passions: Political Offices and Democratic Ethics (Princeton University Press, 2002). 
Thompson, Dennis F. Political Ethics and Public Office (Harvard University Press, 1987). 
Thompson, Dennis F. Restoring Responsibility (Cambridge University Press, 2005). 
Graham, J., Haidt, J., Nosek, B. A. (2009). "Liberals and conservatives rely on different sets of moral foundations." Journal of Personality and Social Psychology, 96(5), 1029-1046.

Social ethics
Political philosophy